James M. Baker may refer to:

 James M. Baker (mayor) (born 1942), mayor of Wilmington, Delaware from 2001 to 2013
 James M. Baker (Virginia politician) (1845–1927), member of the Virginia House of Delegates
 James Marion Baker (1861–1940), 11th Secretary of the United States Senate
 James McNair Baker (1821–1892), American jurist and politician in the Confederate Senate during Civil War
 James Mitchell Baker (1878–1956), South African Olympic runner